James Camacho "Jim" Moylan (born July 18, 1962) is a Guamanian politician serving as the delegate to the U.S. House of Representatives for Guam. He became a member of the Guam Legislature in 2019 and was elected to the U.S House of Representatives in the 2022 United States midterm elections.

Education 
Moylan graduated from John F. Kennedy High School and earned a Bachelor of Science degree in criminal justice from the University of Guam.

Career 
Prior to entering politics, Moylan served as a commissioned officer in the United States Army and parole officer for the Guam Department of Corrections. He was elected to the Guam Legislature in 2018 and assumed office in 2019. Moylan is also a licensed insurance agent.

Moylan was the Republican nominee for the 2022 United States House of Representatives election in Guam. He won the election, defeating Judith Won Pat. He is the first Republican to represent Guam as a delegate since Vicente T. Blaz in 1993. James Moylan.

Personal life 
His mother, Maria Camacho Moylan, was related to Carlos Camacho; through his father, who was the brother of Scotty Moylan, he is related to Kurt Moylan, Kaleo Moylan and Douglas Moylan.

References

External links

|-

|-

1962 births
21st-century American politicians
Chamorro people
Delegates to the United States House of Representatives from Guam
Guamanian people of Spanish descent
Guamanian Republicans
Living people
Members of the Legislature of Guam
Place of birth missing (living people)
Republican Party members of the United States House of Representatives from Guam
University of Guam alumni